Richard Thompson may refer to:

Arts and entertainment
 Richard Thompson (animator) (1914–1998), Warner Bros. cartoon animator in the 1950s
 Richard Thompson (cartoonist) (1957–2016), cartoonist who also worked as an illustrator
 Richard Thompson (musician) (born 1949), songwriter and musician
 Richard Earl Thompson (1914–1991), artist
 Rick Thompson (Falling Skies), a character from the television series Falling Skies

Politics
 Sir Richard Thompson, 1st Baronet (1912–1999), British Conservative politician
 Richard Thompson (Australian politician) (1832–1906), New South Wales politician
 Richard Thompson (Maine politician) (born 1947), attorney and Democratic member of the Maine House of Representatives
 Richard Thompson (MP for Reading) (died c. 1735), British Whig politician
 Richard E. Thompson, member of the Mississippi State Senate
 Richard Frederick Thompson (1873–1949), farmer and political figure in Saskatchewan, Canada
 Richard Henry Thompson (1906–1964), Australian politician and Methodist lay preacher
 Richard W. Thompson (1809–1900), United States Secretary of the Navy

Religion
 Richard Thompson (priest) (1648–1685), Dean of Bristol
 Richard Thomson (theologian) (died 1613), or Thompson, 17th-century theologian
 Richard L. Thompson (1947–2008), American author and Gaudiya Vaishnava religious figure

Sports
 Richard Thompson (footballer, born 1969), English football player
 Richard Thompson (footballer, born 1974), English football player
 Richard Thompson (sprinter) (born 1985), Trinidad and Tobago sprinter
 Rich Thompson (outfielder) (born 1979), American baseball player
 Rich Thompson (pitcher, born 1984), Australian baseball player
 Rich Thompson (pitcher, born 1958), American baseball player

Other
 Richard Thompson (marine biologist), director of the Marine Institute at the University of Plymouth, coined the term "microplastics"
 Richard Thompson (physician) (born 1940), president of the Royal College of Physicians and formerly physician to the Queen
 Richard Thompson (Royal Navy officer) (born 1966), British admiral
 Richard F. Thompson (1930–2014), American behavioral neuroscientist
 Richard H. Thompson (philatelist) (1903–1985), American philatelist
 Richard Horner Thompson (1926–2016), U.S. Army general
 Richard M. Thomson (born 1933), Canadian banker
 Richard W. Thompson (journalist) (1865–1920), journalist and public servant in Indiana and Washington, D.C.
 Richard Thompson, former prosecutor and current president of Thomas More Law Center
 Richard Thompson, mathematician for whom the infinite Thompson groups are named

See also
 Dick Thompson (disambiguation)
 Rich Thompson (disambiguation)
 Richard Thomson (disambiguation)
 Thompson (surname)